

Definitions

U.S. National Weather Service

The PoP measure is meaningless unless it is associated with a period of time. NWS forecasts commonly use PoP defined over 12-hour periods (PoP12), though 6-hour periods (PoP6) and other measures are also published. A "daytime" PoP12 means from 6 am to 6 pm.

The NWS also provides hourly forecasts. The hourly PoP can be similar to the daily PoP and vary little, or it can vary dramatically.

An example of an event where the hourly PoPs are not independent is a hurricane. In that case, there may be a 1 in 5 chance of the hurricane hitting a given stretch of coast, but if it does arrive there will be rain for several hours.

Other US forecasters 

AccuWeather's definition is based on the probability at the forecast area's official rain gauge. There is also a probability of precipitation for every location in the United States for every minute for the next two hours. This is also known as a minute-cast. The Weather Channel's definition may include precipitation amounts below 0.01 inch (0.254 mm) and includes the chance of precipitation 3 hours before or after the forecast period. This latter change was described as less objective and more consumer-centric. The Weather Channel has an observed wet bias – the probability of precipitation is exaggerated in some cases.

Environment Canada 

Environment Canada reports a chance of precipitation (COP) that is defined as "The chance that measurable precipitation (0.2 mm of rain or 0.2 cm of snow) will fall on any random point of the forecast region during the forecast period." The values are rounded to 10% increments, but are never rounded to 50%.

UK Met Office 

The UK's Met Office reports a POP that is rounded to 5% and is based on a minimum threshold of 0.1 mm of precipitation.

Alternative expressions 

The probability of precipitation can also be expressed using descriptive terms instead of numerical values. For instance, the NWS might describe a precipitation forecast with terms such as "slight chance" meaning 20% certainty and "scattered" meaning 30–50% areal coverage. The precise meaning of these terms varies.

The UK's Met Office replaced descriptive terms, such as "likely", with percentage chance of precipitation in November 2011.

Public understanding 

Probability of precipitation may be widely misunderstood by the general public.

The Plain English Campaign objected to the Met Office's use of the phrase "probability of precipitation" in 2011. The Met Office explained that the proposed alternative, "chance of rain", would not describe all the forms of precipitation included in the forecast.

See also
 Quantitative precipitation forecast

References

Numerical climate and weather models
Climate and weather statistics
Weather forecasting